Oxyodontus is a genus of beetles in the family Carabidae, containing the following species:

 Oxyodontus piliferus Louwerens, 1952
 Oxyodontus tripunctatus Chaudoir, 1869

References

Lebiinae